is a Japanese anime series and a PlayStation 2 video game created by Namco. The video game and anime were both initially released in Japan in 2003. Studio Deen produced a 12-episode anime television series broadcast on TBS in Japan in 2004. The series was originally licensed in North America by ADV Films who initially released the series in three English language DVD volumes in 2005 and 2006.

Plot summary

Tomokazu Mikuri, the main character in the game and anime, turns 16 years old and has led a dull life without girls. On the night of his birthday, he dreams of a strange world in which he sees a young girl in a blue outfit fighting against an unknown enemy. Tomokazu has a strange, unknown power which seems to "power up" this girl, who has fallen into his arms. She uses this "power" to repel enemies, the alien race known as the Feydooms, who are attempting to break through the dream world and take over the real world.

Waking up, Tomokazu is amazed at his dream's realism, thinking of his strange power and the mysterious girl who fought off her enemies. Rolling over, he is shocked to see the girl from his dream, Mone, in bed next to him. Soon Tomokazu, his classmate Mizuki Agatsuma, Mone, Neneko, Nanase, and her sister Kuyou enter the dream world Moera to destroy the Feydooms and save the world.

Media

Game
 is a Namco video game released by Namco in Japan for the PlayStation 2 on April 24, 2003. The game was never released in an English version or licensed for distribution outside Japan. However, Neneko and Neito do appear in Project X Zone, which released in regions outside of Japan in 2013, as a singular assist character.

Manga
 was also adapted into manga series illustrated by Katsura Yukimaru and published by Media Works. The series was published in the manga Dengeki Daioh in 2003. A related manga series, was published by Media Works in the manga Dengeki Daioh in 2004. Neither manga series was ever released in English nor licensed for distribution outside Japan.

Anime

North American release
The series was originally licensed and released in North America by ADV Films. ADV Films also produced the English language version initially released in three DVD volumes beginning in 2005 and in two complete DVD collections in 2007 and 2009. In 2013 Sentai Filmworks licensed the series for North America, released a complete DVD collection of all twelve episodes of the ADV Films English version and posted the series (English only) on the Anime Network online streaming site.
 
 Yumeria - Into the Dreamscape (DVD 1), episodes 1–4, release date: 2005-10-11
 Yumeria - Tossing and Turning (DVD 2), episodes 5–8, release date: 2005-11-22
 Yumeria - The End of a Dream (DVD 3), episodes 9-12, release date: 2006-01-03
 Yumeria - DVD Complete Collection (Thinpak) (DVD 1-3), episodes 1-12, release date: 2007-01-09
 Yumeria - Complete Collection (DVD), episodes 1-12, release date: 2009-03-17
 Yumeria - Complete Collection (DVD), episodes 1-12, release date: 2013-11-12

Reception

Yumeria - Into the Dreamscape (DVD 1) (2005) was reviewed by Theron Martin of Anime News Network and assigned grades from "D+" (story) to "B+" (art)  Chris Beveridge of Mania.com assigns a grade of "C+" overall and Tim Henderson of animefringe gives it a "3" out of "5".

Yumeria - DVD Complete Collection (Thinpak) (DVD 1-3) (2007) was reviewed by Bryan Morton of Mania.com and assigned an overall grade of "B−".

Yumeria - Complete Collection (DVD) (2009) was reviewed by Chris Beveridge and assigned an overall grade of "B−".

References

External links
 Official Namco Yumeria game website 
 TV Animation "Yumeria" Official Site 
 
 

2003 video games
2004 anime television series debuts
ADV Films
Anime television series based on video games
Bandai Namco Entertainment franchises
Bishōjo games
Dengeki Comics
Magical girl anime and manga
Harem anime and manga
Harem video games
Japan-exclusive video games
Namco games
PlayStation 2-only games
PlayStation 2 games
Sentai Filmworks
Shōnen manga
Studio Deen
Video games developed in Japan